Laura Hodges (née Summerton) (born 13 December 1983) is an Australian female professional basketball player, having played in Australia's Women's National Basketball League (WNBL), Europe, and the WNBA. She currently plays for the Adelaide Lightning in the WNBL.

She has been a member of Australia women's national basketball team, winning a pair of silver medals with the team at the 2004 Summer Olympics, 2008 Summer Olympics and a bronze at the 2012 Summer Olympics. She won a gold medal at the 2006 Commonwealth Games and 2006 World Championships.

Personal
Hodges was born on 13 December 1983 in Adelaide, South Australia. 
She was a student in 2006, and attended Jennifer Screen's 30 June 2007 wedding in Adelaide. Her married last name is Hodges.

Basketball
As a competitor at the 2002 Australian Under-20 national championships, Hodges won the Bob Staunton Award as the player of the tournament. In 2003, she was described as one of the best young talents in the country.

Professional basketball

Hodges is a professional basketball player. She has played in Australia's WNBL, Europe, and the WNBA.

Hodges had a scholarship with and played for the Australian Institute of Sport in 2000 and 2001. At the end of the season 2000/2001 season, she was voted the NBL Rookie of the Year. She played 44 games for the Australian Institute of Sport team. She played in the WNBL in the 2002/2003 season for the Adelaide Lightning and was with the team up to the 2005/2006 season. Between 2001/2002 and 2005/2006, she had 85 caps with the team. From her start with AIS until the end of 2005/2006 WNBL season, she averaged 14.8 points a game, 6.5 rebounds a game and 1.9 assists a game.

Hodges has played for the Italian side Basket Parma. She played for Bracco Geas in Italy from 2010 to 2012, where she wore jersey number 11. In the 2011/2012 season, she played 24 games, averaging 28.7 minutes a game, 9.4 points a game, shot 67.4% from the free throw line, 49.7% from the 2-point field goal range and 35.1% from the three-point field goal range.

Hodges played for the Connecticut Sun in the WNBA and was with the team during the 2006 season.

National team
Hodges has represented Australia on the Junior, Young and Senior levels.

As a member of the 2000 Australia Junior Women's Team, Hodges won a gold medal at the World Qualification Series. She was a member of the Australian Junior Women's Team that competed at the 2001 World Championships in the Czech Republic. In 2002, she was a member of the Australian Junior Women's Team that won a gold medal in the World Qualification Series. In 2003, she was a member of the Australian Young Women's Team that competed at the World Championships in Croatia.

Hodges was a member of the Australian Opals that won a silver medal in the 2002 World Championships in Spain. She was viewed by national team coaches in 2003 as an emerging talent alongside other players like Lauren Jackson, Penny Taylor, and Hollie Grima. That year, she was a member of the team that competed in the Oceania Championship Series. She went on to represent Australia on the basketball team at the 2004 Summer Olympics where she won a silver medal.

Hodges was a member of the 2005 Opals. She stayed on the roster in 2006, winning a gold medal with the team at the Commonwealth Games, wearing number 11. That year, she was also part of the team that took home a gold medal at the World Championships in Brazil. In March 2007, Summerton was named to the national team what would prepare for the 2008 Summer Olympics. She stayed on the roster, went to the games and earned a silver medal.

Hodges was viewed by national team coach Carrie Graf in June 2010 as one of a quartet of strong players that would represent Australia in a tour of China, the United States and Europe. In July 2010, she participated in a four-day training camp and one game test match against the United States in Connecticut. She was named to the 2012 Australia women's national basketball team. She was scheduled to participate in the national team training camp held from 14 to 18 May 2012 at the Australian Institute of Sport. She was part of the Australian team that won the bronze medal.

See also
List of Australian WNBA players
WNBL Rookie of the Year Award

References

1983 births
Living people
Adelaide Lightning players
Australian expatriate basketball people in France
Australian expatriate basketball people in Italy
Australian expatriate basketball people in the United States
Australian Institute of Sport basketball (WNBL) players
Australian women's basketball players
Basketball players at the 2004 Summer Olympics
Basketball players at the 2006 Commonwealth Games
Basketball players at the 2008 Summer Olympics
Basketball players at the 2012 Summer Olympics
Basketball players at the 2016 Summer Olympics
Commonwealth Games gold medallists for Australia
Commonwealth Games medallists in basketball
Connecticut Sun players
Medalists at the 2004 Summer Olympics
Medalists at the 2008 Summer Olympics
Medalists at the 2012 Summer Olympics
Olympic basketball players of Australia
Olympic bronze medalists for Australia
Olympic medalists in basketball
Olympic silver medalists for Australia
Small forwards
Basketball players from Adelaide
Women's National Basketball League players
Medallists at the 2006 Commonwealth Games